"The Man that Got Away" is a torch song, published in 1953 and written for the 1954 version of the film A Star Is Born. The music was written by Harold Arlen, and the lyrics by Ira Gershwin. In 1954, it was nominated for the Academy Award for Best Original Song. In 2004, Judy Garland's performance of the song was selected by the American Film Institute as the eleventh greatest song in American cinema history.

Composition
"The Man That Got Away" was one of several songs composed by Harold Arlen and Ira Gershwin for the 1954 film A Star is Born, a vehicle for Judy Garland, whom Arlen had already provided with the career-defining songs "Over the Rainbow" and "Get Happy". Arlen and Gershwin would collaborate on songs for A Star is Born afternoons at Gershwin's Beverly Hills mansion, Arlen being seated at a Steinway while Gershwin would work on the lyrics seated at a card table. "The Man That Got Away" was written in response to screenwriter Moss Hart's request for a "dive song". Ira Gershwin's wife Leonore overheard the melody Arlen was working on and opined that it sounded as if it could have been written by Gershwin's deceased collaborator and brother George Gershwin. Not wanting to be an ersatz George Gershwin, Arlen swiftly began playing a melody he had written several years previously for a song which had evidently either never been completed or left unpublished, as its lyricist Johnny Mercer had penned forgettable lyrics for it. (To wit: "I've seen Sequoia, it's really very pretty, the art of Goya, and Rockefeller City, but since I saw you, I can't believe my eyes." The Gershwin Collection at the Harry Ransom Humanities Research Center at the University of Texas at Austin contains a typescript draft of the lyrics with Ira Gershwin's handwritten changes.) Ira Gershwin found the melody arresting, and came up with the title "The Man That Got Away" (Ira Gershwin quote:) "as a paraphrase of the [fisherman's boast] 'You should have seen the one that got away'". The composition of the song proved arduous, with hours passing before Gershwin had the opening stanza.

Ira Gershwin had not wanted any of the songs he and Arlen wrote for the film to be "leaked" prior to the score being finished and made Arlen promise to respect this, a request Gershwin reiterated when Arlen mentioned he would be visiting Palm Springs, where Judy Garland - along with her husband Sid Luft, producer of A Star is Born - would be at that time. While accompanying Garland and Sid Luft as they played their way around a Palm Springs golf course, Arlen began whistling the melody of "The Man That Got Away": Garland soon guessed the tune's provenance and insisted that the three of them retire to the clubhouse, where there was a piano for Arlen to play the song properly for Garland and Luft who (in Arlen's words) "went wild with joy."

Judy Garland performance and recording

Judy Garland recorded "The Man That Got Away" with the Warner Bros. orchestra under the direction of Ray Heindorf using an arrangement by Skip Martin. Garland's performance of the song in A Star is Born is unusual for being filmed in one continuous shot. In the finished take, Garland (as Esther Blodgett) performs the song in a nightclub during a musicians-only session after closing time. The chairs are up on the tables for floor cleaning, the air is filled with cigarette smoke, and Garland's character, without an audience other than her musician friends, is encouraged by the pianist to rise from her seat on the piano bench and "take it from the top."

"The Man That Got Away" is arguably the most important single musical sequence in the entire film. As one of the first segments filmed for the movie, it was photographed in three costumes on three occasions, in over forty partial or complete takes. Judy Garland recorded the song on September 3, 1953, and the number was first filmed on Wednesday, October 21, 1953.

Due to technical limitations of the medium at the time, the cameraman could not give director George Cukor what he wanted: "low light levels, the impressionistic feeling of the musical instruments, Garland moving in and out of pools of light," so he was fired. Cukor realized later that the film stock itself was the problem, not the cinematographer, and re-employed him in a number of other films later on.

Changes were then made to the costume and set and the number was filmed a second time the following Thursday, October 29. Art director Gene Allen said, "The first time it looked as if we had painted a set to look like a bar. So to give it a slightly impressionistic look I...put a scrim between the musicians and the back bar. If you look very carefully at that scene you can see the scrim nailed down on the floor..."

According to sound man Earl Bellamy: "When Judy sang to playback, you could never hear anything...She wanted me to start off at a full blast and then she topped that...her huge voice carrying out over the rafters. You could hear Judy clear as a bell, and she sang right with it..."

Garland did 27 takes of the number over three days, both partial and complete, but according to Allen, "Cukor had her doing all sorts of different bits of business before the song. All of that action didn't really fit the song though — it was just too busy. Plus, she didn't look good — her costume was wrinkled, and didn't fit right...." If that weren't enough, the color was too brown for her complexion as well.

Four months later it was filmed for a third time in February 1954, with new hairstyle and costume and a totally brand new set. Cukor felt this time they had finally got it right: "I think we've generated a lot of sex...She looks perfectly charming in a new Jean-Louis dress, and I know that this too is an enormous improvement over the way we first did it — it has fun and spirit."

Main principal photography for the film began in earnest around the first week of February, 1954. Ten days later, the number was filmed in Technicolor and CinemaScope. As a result of the fabulous color renditions and faithful representations of the sweeping views, Jack L. Warner and Producer Sid Luft agreed to scrap nearly two weeks of footage to date and began the film again. The original takes are added as a special feature on the currently available DVD.

Garland later sang this song as a regular part of her concert repertoire for the rest of her career as well as on the Sammy Davis Jr. Show in 1966.

2019 dance version
In November 2019, Universal Records issued a new dance/club version of the song, which was remixed by Eric Kupper and as such, both Garland and Kupper received billing on the single. The track also gave Garland her first posthumous appearance on the Billboard Dance Club Songs chart, debuting at number 41 in the November 9, 2019 issue.

Chart positions

Covers
The song has occasionally been sung as "The Gal That Got Away" by male singers such as Frank Sinatra, Tony Bennett, Sammy Davis Jr. and Bobby Darin.
Clare Fischer's novel arrangement (recorded June 1960, released February 1962), scored for strings, harp, and a jazz quartet led by vibraphonist Cal Tjader, was one of the highlights of Cal Tjader Plays Harold Arlen, the earliest recorded document of Tjader's and Fischer's longstanding association.
Jeff Buckley frequently performed the song (under its original title) on his last tour before his death in 1997.  His live performance of the song at Great American Music Hall in San Francisco made it on to his posthumous album Mystery White Boy in 2000.
Audra McDonald also sang a version, which is on her album How Glory Goes. 
Barbra Streisand sang a version on her 1993-94 concert tour, publicly dedicating her rendition to Garland's memory. 
The song was covered by Ella Fitzgerald on her album Jazz at the Philharmonic, The Ella Fitzgerald Set, in a recording featuring Ray Brown on bass. She recorded it again for Verve on her double-album Ella Fitzgerald Sings the Harold Arlen Songbook (1961).
Jim Bailey sang the song as Garland  on The Ed Sullivan Show in 1970 and retained the song in his repertoire. 
Rufus Wainwright performed it in his tribute revues of Garland's best known songs, recorded on the live album Rufus Does Judy at Carnegie Hall (2007). 
Maria Friedman covered the song on her self-titled album, which was reissued in the U.S. under the title Now & Then. 
Cher recorded the song for her album Bittersweet White Light (1973).
Shirley Bassey recorded the song for her album The Fabulous Shirley Bassey (1959).
Sheena Easton also included a rather freeform rendition of the song on her album No Strings (1993).
Hilary Swank sings along with Garland while watching a DVD of the original movie during her lonely 30th birthday in the 2007 romantic comedy P.S. I Love You.
In 2008 on the BBC-TV show I'd Do Anything, Jessie Buckley sang this song. Andrew Lloyd Webber described it as "the best performance by a girl your age I have ever heard".
Lorna Luft (Garland's daughter from her marriage with Sid Luft) also sings the song on her album Songs My Mother Taught Me. She also sings it in concert from time to time.
Courtney Love and her band Hole performed the song in concert on more than one occasion during their 2010 tour.
Sylvia Brooks recorded this song on her album Dangerous Liaisons (2009).
Idina Menzel sang this song during her Spring 2009 tour promoting her album I Stand.
Raul Esparza sang a moving rendition without changing the gender, leaving the lyric as "man", at the February 22, 2010 Broadway Backwards 5 benefit for NYC's Lesbian & Gay Community Center AND Broadway Cares/Equity Fights AIDS.
On May 1, 2010, on the BBC TV show Over the Rainbow, Lauren Samuels sang this song. Andrew Lloyd Webber said she made the song her own.
Kristin Chenoweth sang the song on her Coming Home Tour.
Billy Porter sang the song on Pose while performing in an AIDS Cabaret, without changing the gender, leaving the lyric as "man" in 2018. 
 Elizabeth Gilles sings the song on Dynasty while performing as a lounge singer in the imagined version of Liam Ridley’s dictated novel pitch in the episode “You See Most Things in Terms of Black & White” in 2020.

References

Judy Garland songs
Songs with music by Harold Arlen
Songs with lyrics by Ira Gershwin
1953 songs
Pop standards
Songs written for films
Torch songs
2019 songs
House music songs